Marvin B. "Marv" Hanson (December 12, 1943 – February 29, 2004) was a farmer and politician.

From Hallock, Minnesota, Hanson received his bachelor's degree from University of Minnesota and his law degree from Columbia Law School. He had served in the United States Peace Corps. Hanson served in the Minnesota State Senate as a Democrat from 1977 to 1982. Hanson attended Red River Lutheran Church near Hallock. He died from a heart attack at his home in Kennedy, Minnesota.

Notes

1943 births
2004 deaths
People from Hallock, Minnesota
University of Minnesota alumni
Columbia Law School alumni
Peace Corps volunteers
Democratic Party Minnesota state senators
20th-century American politicians
People from Kittson County, Minnesota